Friedrich Schorlemmer (born 16 May 1944) is a German Protestant theologian. He was a prominent member of the civil rights movement in the German Democratic Republic and has continued to take part in politics after German reunification in 1990.

Early years and professional career
Born in Wittenberge on the river Elbe, Friedrich Schorlemmer grew up in the small town of Werben in the region of Altmark, just south of it. The son of a Protestant minister, Schorlemmer was not allowed by the East German authorities to take the exam sat a normal secondary state school, but he passed his at an adult education centre. As a pacifist, he refused to do military service. From 1962 to 1967 he studied theology at Martin-Luther University in Halle. Then, he was a supervisor of studies in a hall of residence and a curate in Halle West. After his ordination in 1970, he worked as a minister in charge of young people and especially students in Merseburg. In 1978, he became a lecturer at the Protestant Preachers' Seminary in Wittenberg and also a preacher at All Saints' Church (Schlosskirche, "Castle Church") there, which is closely associated with Martin Luther and his 95 Theses. Finally, from 1992 until his retirement in December 2007, he was Head of Studies at the Protestant Academy of Saxony-Anhalt in Wittenberg.

Schorlemmer was a member of the Protestant synods of Saxony and of East Germany.

Politics
When, in 1968, Alexander Dubček tried to reform communism in Czechoslovakia in the Prague Spring, Schorlemmer and his friends not only sympathized with that development but also spread information about it. In the 1970s and 1980s, he worked for environmental, human rights and peace groups. The department "Political Underground" of the State Security Service (Stasi) put him under observation. He was responsible for a symbolical act at the Protestant Church Congress (Kirchentag) in Wittenberg on 24 September 1983, in which a sword was turned into a ploughshare by Stefan Nau, a local blacksmith. The State Security Service did not interfere because the future West German President Richard von Weizsäcker, who was then Mayor of West Berlin, attended the Congress as a representative of the Council of the Protestant Church in Germany, and the Western media reported about it.

In 1988, Schorlemmer's Wittenberg peace group presented twenty theses at the Church Congress in Halle, demanding more freedom.

On 21 August 1989, Schorlemmer was among the founders of a group called Democratic Awakening (Demokratischer Aufbruch) in Dresden. However, when this group had become a political party in December 1989, Wolfgang Schnur (who was later to be found out to have been a collaborator of the Stasi) and Rainer Eppelmann increasingly worked together with the Christian Democratic Union, Schorlemmer and some other members left it. Schorlemmer joined the East German Social Democrats in the beginning of 1989.

The largest mass meeting in the history of the GDR took place on Alexanderplatz (Alexander Square) in East Berlin on 4 November 1989. Many East Germans were no longer willing to accept the dictatorship of the ruling Socialist Unity Party of Germany (SED). It was a dangerous situation, with the possibility of a clash between the demonstrators and armed forces. One of the speakers at the Alexanderplatz demonstration was Schorlemmer. He called for change and a new beginning, but he also pleaded for nonviolence.

After the Berlin Wall had been opened on 9 November 1989, a lot of people left East Germany. Schorlemmer and others published a passionate appeal to stay and build up a new and better kind of society there: Für unser Land ("For our country"). Still, the majority of East Germans supported parties like the CDU in the "Alliance for Germany" (Allianz für Deutschland), which stood for quick re-unification with West Germany. Unification came on 3 October 1990.

Schorlemmer remained politically active. He was leader of the SPD in Wittenberg town council from 1990 to 1994. He is chairman of the Willy Brandt Society (Willy-Brandt-Kreis). He is one of the editors of the journal Der Freitag ("Friday"; a weekly with a daily online edition) and of the monthly Blätter für deutsche und internationale Politik. As a member of the German centre of International PEN, the association of writers, he was among the authors of an open letter in 2004 that asked Muslim intellectuals to protest against international terrorism. He joined the German Commission for UNESCO and the BUND, an organization for the protection of nature and the environment. In 2009, he joined ATTAC, the network of globalization critics. Also, he was one of the founders of the Institut Solidarische Moderne in January 2010.

Schorlemmer spoke out against the wars in Afghanistan in 2001 and Iraq in 2003.

Schorlemmer was awarded the Carl von Ossietsky Medal of the International League for Human Rights in 1989, the Peace Prize of the German Book Trade in 1993, an honorary doctorate by Concordia University in Austin (Texas) in 2002, and the Order of Merit of the Federal Republic of Germany in 2009.

He has published numerous books, essays, speeches and sermons.

References

1944 births
East German dissidents
Living people
People from Wittenberge
German Protestants
German Christian socialists
German Christian pacifists
Lutheran pacifists
Officers Crosses of the Order of Merit of the Federal Republic of Germany
Lutheran socialists